Polysoma aenicta is a moth of the family Gracillariidae. It is known from Zimbabwe.

The larvae feed on Albizia gummifera species. They mine the leaves of their host plant. The mine has the form of a moderate, irregular, transparent blotch mine.

References

Endemic fauna of Zimbabwe
Gracillariinae
Lepidoptera of Zimbabwe
Moths of Sub-Saharan Africa
Moths described in 1961